Manda, or Manda-Matumba, is a Bantu language of Tanzania.

References

Languages of Tanzania
Northeast Bantu languages